Alan Cox (born June 23, 1971) is an American radio/TV personality. Cox is currently the afternoon host on 100.7 WMMS in Cleveland, Ohio. Prior to Cleveland & Detroit, Cox was on the air at the former WKQX (Q101), in Chicago & WXDX-FM in Pittsburgh, PA. Cox began his career on stations in Rockford, Illinois and Kalamazoo, Michigan.

Cox is known for literate, polite and caustic stream-of-consciousness commentary, left-leaning political views, and absurdist comedy routines. Contrary to conventional wisdom among radio personalities, Cox had been successful despite divulging very little about his personal life. Since debuting the show in Cleveland, he has become much more candid, regularly discussing various aspects of his personal life.

Early career
Alan Cox grew up in Loves Park, IL- much closer to Wisconsin than Chicago, though Cox has worked to build a narrative about “being from Chicago”. It is accurate to say that Alan Cox began writing and performing stand-up comedy around Chicago during college in the early 1990s. A classmate in a public speaking class at Northwestern University recommended Cox try his hand at radio, and he was briefly on the air at his college station. A chance meeting with an outgoing intern at WLUP-FM ("The Loop") in Chicago led to Cox filling the position for the Jonathon Brandmeier Radio Showgram, one of the most successful shows in Chicago radio history. Cox's intelligence, humor, and willingness to do a variety of on-air stunts for the show led to his hiring as a producer. After two years, Cox left The Loop to begin his own radio show. In September 1995, he was hired to do nights at WRKR-FM in Kalamazoo, MI. His irreverent comedy and outspoken style made the show an instant hit in the college town, and he was promoted to afternoon drive one year later.

105.9 WXDX-FM Pittsburgh
In December 1998, Cox was hired to fill the afternoon drive slot at WXDX-FM (105.9 The X) in Pittsburgh, one of the country's most prominent and highly rated alternative stations. The Alan Cox Radio Show debuted to mixed reviews, but after a year, his quick wit, unfiltered opinions, and verbal sparring with listeners on a wide array of topics made Cox one of the most popular personalities in the market. He began writing columns for local newspapers and magazines, as well as being hired by the NHL to be the arena host for the Pittsburgh Penguins.

After his first year on WXDX, Cox was hired by Pittsburgh's PBS affiliate WQED to provide a young, liberal face and voice for a new weekly panel segment on a newsmagazine show called On Q. The segment, which placed Cox onstage with local conservative host Fred Honsberger, radio host Lynn Cullen, and think-tank advisor Jerry Bowyer became so popular that it was spun off into a separate show called Off Q. The show provided the perfect complement to Cox's radio show and his visibility in the market grew dramatically, as it introduced his intelligence and humor to an older audience unfamiliar with his work on WXDX.

In June 2004, The Alan Cox Radio Show was moved to mornings after WXDX's parent company, Clear Channel, dropped The Howard Stern Show for content issues. While Cox's show took some time to reboot for a new audience, his popularity provided an easier transition than most stations losing Stern. Cox also returned to his stand-up comedy roots by hosting open mic nights at area clubs and frequently worked new material for live audiences. In June 2006, Cox was informed by WXDX management that his contract would not be renewed. Despite solid ratings and an extremely loyal audience, speculation was that Clear Channel Communications simply wouldn't justify Cox's increasingly lucrative contract and dumped the show in a cost-cutting move.

Q101 Chicago
In August 2006, Cox was hired to return to Chicago as the host of The Morning Fix, a new conceptual ensemble show at heritage alternative WKQX-FM (Q101). (Ironically, this put Cox down the hall from his former mentor Brandmeier, who returned to host mornings at sister station WLUP after the station was purchased by Emmis in 2005.) The Morning Fix combined the sensibilities of improv and stand-up comedy with traditional radio elements and replaced the outgoing Mancow Muller, who had been Q101's morning host for nearly a decade. In November 2007, after 14 months of turbulence, the ensemble members of the Morning Fix were let go, due to the show's high cost and insufficient ratings. Cox and sports anchor Jim Lynam were asked to stay and create a more music-intensive show.  The new show was a more conversational and caller-intensive incarnation of the former show, and more reminiscent of Cox's solo show. On August 1, 2008, Cox & Lynam's "Morning Fix" was canceled.  They were replaced temporarily by Q101 weekend DJ Alex Quigley until August 11, 2008, when Q101's former late afternoon duo Sherman and Tingle took over the WKQX morning duties. Ironically, the ratings at the time of their dismissal placed Cox and Lynam in the top 5 rankings, leading some to speculate that the change was financially motivated, due to Emmis's sagging stock price coinciding with the end of Cox's expensive contract.

Unwilling to leave Chicago, Cox briefly took a job working in the ad sales department of Clear Channel Chicago's smooth jazz station, WNUA 95.5 until January 20, 2009 when he was one of 1,800 employees the media giant laid off nationwide. He continued to perform standup comedy around Chicago and worked two seasons with the WNBA as the arena host for the Chicago Sky.

100.7 WMMS Cleveland
On December 16, 2009, The Alan Cox Show premiered in the afternoon slot on 100.7 WMMS/Cleveland, replacing Maxwell (Ben Bornstein) of The Maxwell Show after contract negotiations fell through between Bornstein and the station. (Coincidentally, Cox and Bornstein nearly worked alongside each other at WXDX-FM in Pittsburgh ten years earlier.)   The show airs weekdays from 2-6p EST and is heard live online at www.alancoxshow.com.  Cox is joined by comedians Bill Squire, Mary Santora, and phone screener Cody "Poundcake" Brown.  Comedian Chad Zumock was co-host of The Alan Cox Show from early 2010 to late 2012; on December 3, 2012, it was announced that he was no longer with WMMS after being arrested for driving while intoxicated. However, on May 3, 2013, Cleveland Scene reported that Zumock had been acquitted of the charge. 

While at WMMS, Alan has been featured in both Talkers (ranked 74th in the publication's 2012 "Heavy Hundred Talk Hosts") and as a cover story for the June 2011 issue of Cleveland Magazine.

100.3 WSDD & WSGX St. Louis
In April 2010, Cox was added as a voice-tracked midday host at 100.3 WSDD St. Louis. The show was recorded live from the WMMS studios and aired weekdays from 10a-4p CST and online at www.soundstl.com. On December 26, 2010, The Sound flipped format to "Gen-X Radio" (and callsign to WSGX) and began playing music only. Cox returned to the station in the same timeslot on February 28, 2011. The station flipped format again in May 2012 to the classic rock format, "100.3 The Brew".

106.7 WDTW Detroit
On November 5, 2012, Cox announced an agreement between him and WMMS owner iHeartMedia to host mornings at classic rock station WDTW-FM/Detroit.  Cox hosted the Detroit show from WMMS through voice-tracking, but also said he would occasionally host both shows from WDTW-FM.

Cox was under contract with WDTW & WMMS through 2017. He also served as fill-in host for the nationally syndicated America Now show.

References

External links 

Radio personalities from Chicago
1971 births
Living people